Dalsfjorden is a fjord in Vestland county, Norway. It is located in the municipalities of Askvoll, Fjaler, and Sunnfjord. It is one of the two main fjords that comprise the Sunnfjord region of the county.

The Dalsfjorden is a narrow fjord that cuts into roughly eastwards from the village of Vilnes on the island of Atløyna in Askvoll municipality. The outer part of the fjord is also known as the Vilnesfjorden. The mouth of the river Gaula is located at the innermost part of the fjord. On the south side of the fjord lies the village of Dale, the administrative centre of the municipality of Fjaler.

There is one ferry operated by Fjord1 Nordvestlandske travelling the Askvoll-Gjervik-Fure route on the western end of the fjord. The Dalsfjord Bridge, connecting Dale and Askvoll, opened in December 2013.

See also
 List of Norwegian fjords

References

Fjords of Vestland
Sunnfjord
Fjaler
Askvoll